John Marquis Hopkins (1870 – 3 July 1912) was an Australian politician. He was a member of the Western Australian Legislative Assembly, representing Boulder from 1901 to 1905 and Beverley from 1908 to 1910. He had been mayor of Boulder from 1898 to 1901. In 1910 he was jailed for five years for uttering, but was released in October 1911.

References

Members of the Western Australian Legislative Assembly
Australian politicians convicted of crimes
1870 births
1912 deaths
People from Victoria (Australia)
Mayors of places in Western Australia